Stuart Grimes (born 4 April 1974) is a Scottish former international rugby player and captain. Grimes' previous clubs include Padova, Border Reivers, Newcastle Falcons, Caledonia Reds, Glasgow Warriors, Watsonians and Edinburgh University RFC. He was previously Newcastle Falcons forwards coach.

Whilst at Newcastle he started in both the 2001 and 2004 Anglo-Welsh Cup finals as Newcastle emerged victorious from both.

References

External links
Stuart Grimes inducted into Aberdeen Hall of Fame 2010 (News Article)
Aberdeen Sporting Hall of Fame
Edinburgh University Sports Union Hall of Fame
Grimes relishing Falcons role
 sporting heroes
 Grimes Scoops Academic Prize
D-day for Grimes ban

 

1974 births
Living people
Rugby union players from Aberdeen
People educated at Robert Gordon's College
Scottish rugby union players
Newcastle Falcons players
Scotland international rugby union players
Caledonia Reds players
Watsonians RFC players
Edinburgh University RFC players
Alumni of the University of Edinburgh
Glasgow Warriors players
North and Midlands players
Rugby union locks
Petrarca Rugby players